The Albanian language is composed of many dialects, divided into two major groups: Gheg and Tosk. The Shkumbin river is roughly the geographical dividing line, with Gheg spoken north of the Shkumbin and Tosk south of it.

Historical considerations 

The characteristics of the Albanian dialects Tosk and Gheg, in the treatment of the native and loanwords from other languages, have led to the conclusion that the dialectal split preceded the Slavic migration to the Balkans.

According to the view of Demiraj, during the process of dialect split Albanian populations were roughly in their present location, while Eric Hamp notes that "it must be relatively old, that is, dating back into the post-Roman first millennium. As a guess, it seems possible that this isogloss reflects a spread of the speech area, after the settlement of the Albanians in roughly their present location, so that the speech area straddled the Jireček Line".

Gheg dialects 

Gheg is divided into four sub-dialects: Northwest Gheg, Northeast Gheg, Central Gheg, and Southern Gheg. Northwest Gheg is spoken throughout Montenegro, northwestern Kosovo (west of Pejë), Lezhë, northwestern Mirditë, western Tropojë, western Pukë, and Shkodër.  Northeast Gheg is spoken throughout most of Kosovo, Preshevë, Has, northeastern Mirditë, eastern Pukë, Kukës, Tropojë, and northern Tetovë. Central Gheg is spoken in Debar, Gostivar, Krujë, northern Durrës, northern Tiranë, Peshkopi, southern Lezhë, southern Mirditë, Mat, Bulqizë, eastern Strugë, Kumanovo, and southern Tetovë.  Southern Gheg is spoken in Durrës, northern Elbasan, northern Pogradec, northern Peqin, Kavajë, northwest Strugë, and Tirana. One fairly divergent dialect is the Upper Reka dialect, which is however classified as Central Gheg. There is also a diaspora dialect in Croatia, the Arbanasi dialect.

Gheg features 

No rhotacism: Proto-Albanian *-n- remains -n- (e.g. râna "sand").
Proto-Albanian *ō becomes vo.
Nasal vowels: Gheg retains the nasal vowels of late Proto-Albanian and the late Proto-Albanian *â plus a nasal remains â (e.g. nândë "nine"). Although, the quality of the vowel varies by dialect, etc. Some Northeast and Northwest Gheg dialects preserve the nasal in words such as  "five" while other Gheg dialects do not,  "five".
Monophthongization: Occurs in some dialects of Shkodër in a few words, e.g.  voe "egg" and  hae "food".
Phonological vowel length:  There is often phonological vowel length in most Gheg dialects. Some dialects of Shkodër have a three length distinction in vowels, for example, short:  "yoke", long:  "pen", and extra-long:  "yokes".
a-vowel: In some dialects occurring in some certain words a may become a diphthong (e.g.  for ballë "forehead") or become  (e.g.  for larg "far").
ë-vowel: Final -ë drops and often lengthens the preceding vowel.
y-vowel: The y vowel can remain as y (e.g. dy "two" in much of the Gheg speaking areas), derounded to i (e.g. "two" in Mat and Mountainous Krujë).
bj/pj: These may yield bgj or pq in some dialects (e.g. pqeshkë for pjeshkë "peach" in Negotin).
dh and ll: These sounds may interchange in some words in some dialects.
h: This may drop in any position in some dialects.

Transitional dialects 
The transitional dialects are spoken in southern Elbasan so-called Greater Elbasan (Cërrik, Dumre, Dushk, Papër, Polis, Qafe, Shpat, Sulovë, Thanë), southern Peqin, northwestern Gramsh, northern Kuçovë, northern Berat, extreme southern Kavajë, northern and central Lushnjë and southern Librazhd (Bërzeshtë, Rrajcë), and Flazian-Falazdim-whish spoken in north of Albania.

Transitional features 
Rhotacism: Proto-Albanian *-n- becomes -r- (e.g. râra "sand").
Proto-Albanian *ō becomes vo in the western sub-dialects or va in the central and eastern sub-dialects.
Nasal vowels: In some sub-dialects of Transitional, some nasal vowels denasalize (e.g. rora "sand" in Sulovë) while in other words the nasals are retained: sŷ "eye" (Dumre, Shpat, Sulovë).
ô-vowel: Some sub-dialects have ô for â in some words (e.g. ôma "taste" in Sulovë).
Mb/Nd: Clusters such as mb become m in some dialects (e.g. koma for standard këmba "leg").

Tosk dialects

Tosk is divided into five sub-dialects: Northern Tosk, Labërisht, Çam, Arvanitika, and Arbëresh.  Northern Tosk is spoken in Berat, Fier, Skrapar, southern Kuçovë, extreme southeastern Elbasan, most of Gramsh, Kolonjë, northern Mallakastër, Korçë, Ohër, Përmet, east of the Vjosë river of Tepelenë, southern Struga (western shore of Lake Ohër), Pogradec, Prespa and northern Vlorë. Lab (or Labërisht) is spoken in southern Vlorë, Dukat, Himarë, southern Mallakastër, Delvinë, southern Çepan of Skrapar, eastern and southern Kolonjë, Leskovik, west of the Vjosë river of Tepelenë, Gjirokastër and Sarandë. Çam is spoken in southern Sarandë (Konispol, Ksamil, Markat, Xarrë) and in parts of northern Greece. Tosk dialects are spoken by most members of the large Albanian immigrant communities of Egypt, Turkey, and Ukraine. Çamërisht is spoken in North-western Greece, while Arvanitika is spoken by the Arvanites in southern Greece, mainly Peloponnese, Attica, Euboea, and the adjacent islands. Arbëresh is spoken by the Arbëreshë, descendants of 15th and 16th century migrants who settled in southeastern Italy, in small communities in the regions of Sicily, Calabria, Basilicata, Campania, Molise, Abruzzi, and Apulia.

Tosk features

Rhotacism: Proto-Albanian *-n- becomes -r- (e.g. rëra "sand")
Proto-Albanian *ō becomes va.
Nasal vowels: There is a lack of nasal vowels in Tosk (e.g. sy "eye") and Late Proto-Albanian *â plus a nasal becomes ë (e.g. nëntë "nine"). However, nasal vowels have been reported in the Lab dialects of Himarë and Kurvelesh  and separately in the Lab dialect of Borsh.
e-vowel: The e becomes ë in some dialects in some words qën for qen "dog" in Vjosë.
Final -ë drops in many Tosk dialects and lengthens the preceding vowel.
y-vowel: The y vowel often derounds to i in the southern dialects Labërisht, Çam, Arvanitika and Arbëresh (e.g. dy "two" becomes di).
Dh and Ll: These sounds may interchange in some words in some dialects.
H: This may drop in any position in some dialects.
Gl/Kl: Some dialects such as Çam, Arberësh, and Arvanitika retain archaic kl and gl in place of q and gj, to which they have shifted in other places (e.g. gjuhë "tongue" is gluhë in Çam, gluhë in Arberësh, and  gljuhë in Arvanitika; "klumësh" for "qumësht" "milk" in Arbëresh).
Rr: Rr becomes r in some dialects.

Related idioms 
Arbëresh language, spoken in parts of Southern Italy.
 Arvanitika language, spoken in part of Greece

Extinct dialects 
Istrian Albanian, spoken in parts of Istria until the late 19th century.

Comparison

References
 Voice recordings in different cities: https://web.archive.org/web/20120128173513/http://www.albanianlanguage.net/en/dialects4.html

Bibliography

Byron, J. L. Selection among Alternates in Language Standardization: The Case of Albanian. The Hague: Mouton, 1976.
Domi, Mahir et al. Dialektologjia shqiptare. 5 vols. Tirana, 1971-1987.

Gjinari, Jorgji. Dialektologjia shqiptare. Pristina: Universiteti, 1970.
Gjinari, Jorgji, Bahri Beci, Gjovalin Shkurtaj, & Xheladin Gosturani. Atlasi dialektologjik i gjuhës shqipe, vol. 1. Naples: Università degli Studi di Napoli L’Orientali, 2007.

 Lloshi, Xhevat. “Substandard Albanian and Its Relation to Standard Albanian”, in Sprachlicher Standard und Substandard in Südosteuropa und Osteuropa: Beiträge zum Symposium vom 12.-16. Oktober 1992 in Berlin. Edited by Norbert Reiter, Uwe Hinrichs & Jirina van Leeuwen-Turnovcova. Berlin: Otto Harrassowitz, 1994, pp. 184–194.
Lowman, G. S. "The Phonetics of Albanian", Language, vol. 8, no. 4 (Dec., 1932);271–293.

Panov, M. and Sidanivoski, J. Gostivarskiot kraj. Gostivar: Sobranie na opštinata, 1970.

 Vehbiu, Ardian. “Standard Albanian and the Gheg Renaissance: A Sociolinguistic Perspective”, International Journal of Albanian Studies 1 (1997): 1–14.

External links
 Robert Elsie's Recordings in many Albanian dialects

 
Languages of Albania
Albanian